Fly Fishing, first published in 1899 by English author and diplomat Edward Grey, 1st Viscount Grey of Fallodon (1862–1933), is a book about fly fishing English chalk streams and spate rivers for trout and salmon. It includes reminisces about the author's fly fishing experiences on Hampshire rivers. The book was in print for nearly 50 years and has been extensively reprinted in the 21st century.

Synopsis

The work deals with fly fishing for trout, sea trout and salmon. Grey places presents fishing for sea trout as the pinnacle of fly fishing and describes the challenge of fly fishing for Atlantic salmon. On trout, he was the first writer of importance on the dry-fly who really knew what the wet-fly meant. Grey was an expert angler and he detailed much that is useful and instructive in prose that is clear and vigorous.

Author

Edward Grey, 1st Viscount Grey of Fallodon KG, PC, FZL, DL (25 April 1862 – 7 September 1933), better known as Sir Edward Grey, Bt, was a British Liberal statesman. He served as Foreign Secretary from 1905 to 1916, the longest continuous tenure of any person in that office. He is probably best remembered for his remark at the outbreak of the First World War: "The lamps are going out all over Europe. We shall not see them lit again in our time". Ennobled as Viscount Grey of Fallodon in 1916, he was Ambassador to the United States between 1919 and 1920 and Leader of the Liberal Party in the House of Lords between 1923 and 1924. He also gained distinction as an ornithologist and angler.

Grey was a contemporary of angler G. E. M. Skues at Winchester College, but it is unknown whether or not the two ever met or fished together while attending school.  At the time of his writing Fly Fishing, Grey was considered one of the finest dry fly fisherman in England and a master of the Hampshire chalkstreams.

Contents
From 1st edition:
 Chapter I – Introductory
 Chapter II – Dry Fly Fishing
 Chapter III – Dry Fly Fishing (continued)
 Chapter IV – Winchester
 Chapter V – Trout Fishing With The Wet Fly
 Chapter VI – Sea Trout Fishing
 Chapter VII – Salmon Fishing
 Chapter VIII – Tackle All
 Chapter IX – Experiments In Stocking
 Chapter X – Some Memories Of Early Days
 Index

List of illustrations

 The Haunt of the Trout, from a drawing by Jessie MacGregor – Frontispiece
 Hampshire Water Meadow, from a drawing by Jessie MacGregor
 Dry Flies and Wet Flies
 Winchester Cathedral, from a drawing by William Hyde
 St. Catherine's Hill, Winchester, from a drawing by William Hyde
 Where Sea Trout Run, from a drawing by Jessie MacGregor
 Salmon and Sea Trout Flies
 A Northumberland Burn, from a drawing by Jessie MacGregor
(The two plates of flies have been copied from specimens supplied by Messrs. Hardy of Alnwick)

Reviews
 The London Times, in noting the first edition of Fly Fishing, stated:

 John Hills in his A History of Fly Fishing for Trout (1921) praises Grey's prose:

 James Robb, in Notable Angling Literature (1945) ranks Grey's Fly Fishing very highly:

Editions
From: Hampton's Angling Bibliography 
 First edition, April 1899, J. M. Dent, London, illustrated by Jessie MacGregor
 Second edition, July 1899, J. M. Dent, London, illustrated by Jessie MacGregor
 Third edition, 1901, J. M. Dent, London, illustrated by Jessie MacGregor
 Fourth edition, 1907, J. M. Dent, London, illustrated by Arthur Rackham
 Fifth edition, 1920, J. M. Dent, London, illustrated by Jessie MacGregor and William Hyde
 Sixth edition, 1928, J. M. Dent, London
 Seventh edition, 1930, J. M. Dent, London, illustrated by Eric Fitch Daglish
 Seventh edition (large paper), 1930, J. M. Dent, London
 Eighth edition, 1934, J. M. Dent, London, illustrated by Eric Fitch Daglish
 Ninth edition, 1947, J. M. Dent, London, illustrated by Eric Fitch Daglish
 Ninth edition (French), Peche A La Mouche, 1947, Librairie des Champs-Elysee, Paris
From 
 Modern Fishing Classics Series edition, 1984, Andre Deutsch Ltd, London
 Pranava Books, 2009. Reprinted from 1920 edition.
 Reprint of 1899 edition, Adegi Graphics LLC, New York, 2011

Further reading

See also
 Bibliography of fly fishing

Notes

1899 non-fiction books
Angling literature
Fly fishing literature
J. M. Dent books